The climate of West Bengal is varied, with tropical savanna in the southern portions of the state, to humid subtropical areas in the north. Temperatures vary widely, and there are five distinct seasons. The area is vulnerable to heavy rainfall, monsoons, and cyclones. There are some mountains in the area which are generally cold all year round.

Seasons
There are five main seasons in West Bengal: spring, summer, rainy season, a short autumn, and winter.

Spring
Spring is considered the most pleasant season over the plains of West Bengal and lies from mid-February to mid-March and is also the time where Holi is celebrated. Temperatures range between 20 °C – 30 °C and no rainfall. Though occasional rain or light showers are witnessed due to Western disturbances in North India.

Summer
The summer season is observed from March to May in most of Bengal.

Temperature

In Bengal, summers can be extremely hot and have high humidity. The plains of South Bengal have a daily maximum temperature around 35–38 °C. It can also exceed 40 °C.
The western highlands experience a dry summer like northern India. During the day, the temperature ranges from 38 to 42 °C, though it can reach or exceed 45 °C.
In summer, the plains of North Bengal are generally cooler than the west and south. In this area, the daily maximum temperature varies from 26 to 32 °C. It occasionally crosses 35 °C. The minimum temperature in summer is approximately 18–22 °C.
The Darjeeling hill region is the coolest area in summer. Here, the daily highest temperature is 15–25 °C.

Rainfall

Monsoons
Period

In mid-June, the monsoon season starts. It continues until the end of September.

Temperature

In most places, the temperature drops as cloud cover increases. This is less true for the mountains and the Terai Dooars plains, where temperature gradually increases until August.

The maximum temperature of South Bengal's plains and western highlands is 32 °C, 31 °C in North Bengal plains and around 19–20 °C in mountains. Sometimes when the sky gets clear, the temperature rises suddenly. This is known as a monsoon break. This occurs mostly in North Bengal plains and in mountains in July and August when the temperature soars over 36 °C and 24 °C respectively.

Rainfall

Most of the annual rainfall occurs during the monsoon period. Heavy rainfall above 250 cm is observed in the Darjeeling, Jalpaiguri, Alipurduar and Cooch Behar district. Later, blowing westwards, the winds cause average rainfall of 125 cm in the northern plains and western plateau region.

Autumn
Period

Autumn lasts for two months, October and November.

Temperature

In autumn, the southwest monsoon wind returns and clears the sky. So, the state gets enough sunshine to be warm in the day and releases a lot of heat to be cool at night.

At this time, a maximum temperature of 30–33 °C is felt over the plains and 17–19 °C in mountains. The minimum temperature is normally around 19–22 °C in plains and 6–11 °C in mountains. Sometimes, cold waves blow over the state in autumn.

Rainfall

In autumn, the southwest monsoon wind returns, and the northeast monsoon wind enters West Bengal. Due to their collision in Bay of Bengal, some cyclones are created. The cyclones cause some rainfall in the state.

Winter
Period

The winter season usually starts in December and ends in February.

Temperature

In winter, a mild temperature is observed over the plains. The maximum temperature goes to 23–26 °C and the minimum temperature is 9–15 °C in plains of the state. The maximum and minimum temperature in the mountains range from 0–12 °C. Higher regions of the Darjeeling Himalayas get heavy snowfall during winter.

The temperatures of the western highlands at night can drop 7–9 °C, 4–7 °C in Siliguri, Jalpaiguri, Coochbehar plains and 10–11 °C in Kolkata when cold waves blow. Darjeeling's temperature can drop below freezing point.

Rainfall

Winter is generally dry. Most days are sunny. Occasionally, slight rainfall occurs because of conditions in northwest India. These are known as western disturbances.

Extremes
'''Sources: India Meteorological Department

Highest Temperature
The chart below shows the highest recorded temperatures for all months in West Bengal, with place and date.

Lowest Temperature
The chart below shows the lowest recorded temperatures for all months in West Bengal, with place and date.

Temperature

The Tropic of Cancer passes 6 km north of Nabadwip, so, according to latitude, the northern part of the state falls in the temperate belt and the southern part falls in the tropical belt. The southern part receives adequate rainfall and is not severely hot due to its proximity to water. Barring the mountainous parts of Darjeeling and Jalpaiguri, the entire state experiences a warm tropical monsoon climate. Regional differences are visible in the climate. In the western plateau region, rainfall is low and variations in temperature are more common. Oceanic influence in the coastal region makes the climate there moderate and pleasant.

Rainfall

Annual rainfall varies in different parts of the state. North Bengal receives the highest rainfall, 200 to 400 cm. In the coastal areas rainfall is about 200 cm, in the Ganga plain and in the central part of the state rainfall is about 150–200 cm, and in the western plateau region the amount of rainfall received is about 100 to 125 cm. Drought is a common phenomenon in the Bankura and Purulia districts. Rainfall that occurs in the summer months often brings about heavy storms called Kalbaishakhi.

Cyclones in West Bengal

Mountainous region

Because of the high altitude, mountainous parts of Darjeeling and Jalpaiguri experience a cool temperate and climate. Snowfall occurs in some parts of this region. Being obstructed by the Himalayas, the region receives heavy rainfall. Due to the scenic beauty and temperate climate of the region, a huge number of tourists visit the areas. Here Kalimpong is another hill station that is visited by many tourists in all seasons for its scenic beauty and the average cool temperature throughout the year.

Influences

Rainfall in the plains of West Bengal influences crop production. The humid climate is good for the production of rice and jute. Higher rainfall received in the northern mountainous region is favorable for the production of tea, which is popular all over the world. Pulses and oilseeds are also produced in large quantities.

The people prefer to wear loose and thin cotton clothes because of the climate. Rice and fish are the staple food of the Bengalis because they are easy to digest in this climate and are readily available. The hot and humid climate hampers the efficiency of the people, as the people tend to get tired easily. For protection against heavy rainfall and snowfall in the north, the people live in houses with sloping roofs.

Climate data

References

West Bengal
Environment of West Bengal
Geography of West Bengal